Clinidium chandleri is a species of ground beetle in the subfamily Rhysodinae. It was described by Ross Bell & J.R. Bell in 2009 and named after entomologist Donald S. Chandler. It is endemic to Costa Rica and occurs in the lowland and lower mountain forests north of the continental divide.

Clinidium chandleri measure  in length.

References

Clinidium
Beetles of Central America
Endemic fauna of Costa Rica
Beetles described in 2009